Robert Bibal (1900–1973) was a French film director and screenwriter.

Selected filmography
 The Mad Night (1932)
 A Gentleman of the Ring (1932)
 The Fugitive (1947)
 My Aunt from Honfleur (1949)
 Little Jacques (1953)
 Dangerous Turning (1954)
 Every Minute Counts (1960)

References

Bibliography
 Goble, Alan. The Complete Index to Literary Sources in Film. Walter de Gruyter, 1999.

External links

1900 births
1973 deaths
20th-century French screenwriters
Film directors from Paris